{{DISPLAYTITLE:5-HT7 receptor}}

 
The 5-HT7 receptor is a member of the GPCR superfamily of cell surface receptors and is activated by the neurotransmitter serotonin (5-hydroxytryptamine, 5-HT) The 5-HT7 receptor is coupled to Gs (stimulates the production of the intracellular signaling molecule cAMP) and is expressed in a variety of human tissues, particularly in the brain, the gastrointestinal tract, and in various blood vessels. This receptor has been a drug development target for the treatment of several clinical disorders. The 5-HT7 receptor is encoded by the HTR7 gene, which in humans is transcribed into 3 different splice variants.

Function 

When the 5-HT7 receptor is activated by serotonin, it sets off a cascade of events starting with release of the stimulatory G protein Gs from the GPCR complex.  Gs in turn activates adenylate cyclase which increases intracellular levels of the second messenger cAMP.

The 5-HT7 receptor plays a role in smooth muscle relaxation within the vasculature and in the gastrointestinal tract. The highest 5-HT7 receptor densities are in the thalamus and hypothalamus, and it is present at higher densities also in the hippocampus and cortex. The 5-HT7 receptor is involved in thermoregulation, circadian rhythm, learning and memory, and sleep. Peripheral 5-HT7 receptors are localized in enteric nerves; high levels of 5-HT7 receptor-expressing mucosal nerve fibers were observed in the colon of patients with irritable bowel syndrome. An essential role of 5-HT7 receptor in intestinal hyperalgesia was demonstrated in mouse models with visceral hypersensitivity, of which a novel 5-HT7 receptor antagonist administered perorally reduced intestinal pain levels.  It is also speculated that this receptor may be involved in mood regulation, suggesting that it may be a useful target in the treatment of depression.

Variants 

Three splice variants have been identified in humans (designated h5-HT7(a), h5-HT7(b), and h5-HT7(d)), which encode receptors that differ in their carboxy terminals. The h5-HT7(a) is the full length receptor (445 amino acids), while the h5-HT7(b) is truncated at amino acid 432 due to alternative splice donor site. The h5-HT7(d) is a distinct isoform of the receptor: the retention of an exon cassette in the region encoding the carboxyl terminal results a 479-amino acid receptor with a c-terminus markedly different from the h5-HT7(a). A 5-HT7(c) splice variant is detectable in rat tissue but is not expressed in humans. Conversely, rats do not express a splice variant homologous to the h5-HT7(d), as the rat 5-HT7 gene lacks the exon necessary to encode this isoform. Drug binding affinities are similar across the three human splice variants; however, inverse agonist efficacies appear to differ between the splice variants.

Discovery 

In 1983, evidence for a 5-HT1-like receptor was first found. Ten years later, 5-HT7 receptor was cloned and characterized. It has since become clear that the receptor described in 1983 is 5-HT7.

Ligands 

Numerous orthosteric ligands of moderate to high affinity are known. Signaling biased ligands were discovered and developed in 2018.

Agonists 

Agonists mimic the effects of the endogenous ligand, which is serotonin at the 5-HT7 receptor (↑cAMP).

 5-Carboxamidotryptamine (5-CT)
 5-methoxytryptamine (5-MT, 5-MeOT)
 8-OH-DPAT (mixed 5-HT1A/5-HT7 agonist)
 Aripiprazole (weak partial agonist)
 AS-19
 E-55888
 E-57431
 LP-12 (4-(2-Diphenyl)-N-(1,2,3,4-tetrahydronaphthalen-1-yl)-1-piperazinehexanamide)
 LP-44 (4-[2-(Methylthio)phenyl]-N-(1,2,3,4-tetrahydro-1-naphthalenyl)-1-piperazinehexanamide)
 LP-211
 MSD-5a
 Nω-Methylserotonin
 N-(1,2,3,4-Tetrahydronaphthalen-1-yl)-4-aryl-1-piperazinehexanamides (can function as either an agonist or antagonist depending on side chain substitution)
 N,N-Dimethyltryptamine
 AGH-107 (water soluble, brain penetrating full agonist) 
 AH-494 (3-(1-ethyl-1H-imidazol-5-yl)-1H-indole-5-carboxamide) 
 AGH-192 (orally bioavailable, water soluble, brain penetrating full agonist)

Antagonists 

Neutral antagonists (also known as silent antagonists) bind the receptor and have no intrinsic activity but will block the activity of agonists or inverse agonists. Inverse agonists inhibit the constitutive activity of the receptor, producing functional effects opposite to those of agonists (at the 5-HT7 receptor: ↓cAMP). Neutral antagonists and inverse agonists are typically referred to collectively as "antagonists" and, in the case of the 5-HT7 receptor, differentiation between neutral antagonists and inverse agonists is problematic due to differing levels of inverse agonist efficacy between receptor splice variants. For instance, mesulergine and metergoline are reported to be neutral antagonists at the h5-HT7(a) and h5-HT7(d) receptor isoforms but these drugs display marked inverse agonist effects at the h5-HT7(b) splice variant.

 3-{4-[4-(4-chlorophenyl)-piperazin-1-yl]-butyl}-3-ethyl-6-fluoro-1,3-dihydro-2H-indol-2-one
 Amisulpride
 Amitriptyline
 Amoxapine
 Brexpiprazole
 Clomipramine
 Clozapine
 CYY1005 (a highly selective, orally active 5-HT7 antagonist) 
 DR-4485
 EGIS-12233 (mixed 5-HT6/5-HT7 antagonist)
 AVN-101 (mixed 5-HT6/5-HT7 antagonist)  
 Fluphenazine
 Fluperlapine
 ICI 169,369
 Imipramine
 JNJ-18038683
 Ketanserin
 Loxapine
 Lurasidone
 LY-215,840
 Maprotiline
 Mesulergine
 Methysergide
 Mianserin
 Olanzapine
 Pimozide
 RA-7 (1-(2-diphenyl)piperazine)
 Ritanserin
 SB-258,719
 SB-258741
 SB-269970 (highly 5-HT7 selective)
 SB-656104-A
 SB-691673
 Sertindole
 Spiperone
 Tenilapine
 TFMPP
 Vortioxetine
 Trifluoperazine
 Ziprasidone
 Zotepine

Inactivating antagonists 

Inactivating antagonists are non-competitive antagonists that render the receptor persistently insensitive to agonist, which resembles receptor desensitization. Inactivation of the 5-HT7 receptor, however, does not arise from the classically described mechanisms of receptor desensitization via receptor phosphorylation, beta-arrestin recruitment, and receptor internalization. Inactivating antagonists all likely interact with the 5-HT7 receptor in an irreversible/pseudo-irreversible manner, as is the case with [3H]risperidone.

 Bromocriptine
 Lisuride
 Metergoline
 Methiothepin
 Paliperidone
 Risperidone

See also 

 5-HT receptor
 5-HT1 receptor
 5-HT2 receptor
 5-HT3 receptor
 5-HT4 receptor
 5-HT5 receptor
 5-HT6 receptor

References

External links 
 
 

Serotonin receptors